Voto latino may refer to:

Latino vote, a topic
Voto Latino, US organization
"Voto latino (Latin Vote)", a song by Molotov on the ¿Dónde Jugarán las Niñas? album